Deborah Anne Dyer  (born 3 August 1967), known mononymously by the stage name Skin and often erroneously as the name of her band Skunk Anansie, is a British singer, songwriter and electronic music DJ. She is the lead vocalist of British rock band Skunk Anansie, a band often grouped as part of the Britrock movement in the UK and gained attention for her powerful, wide-ranging soprano voice and striking look.

In 2015, she joined the judging panel of the Italian version of the talent show The X Factor for one season, and 2016 was on the cover of the UK lesbian magazine Diva. After releasing new music and touring with Skunk Anansie, in 2018 Skin was featured as one of the cover stars of Classic Rock magazine's special "She Rocks" issue and was honoured with the Inspirational Artist Award at the Music Week Awards ahead of celebrating 25 years of Skunk Anansie. She also appeared on the cover of Kerrang! magazine in November 2018.

Mavis Bayton, author of Frock Rock, stated that "women like Skin, Natacha Atlas, Yolanda Charles, and Debbie Smith are now acting as crucial role models for future generations of black women".

Early life 
Deborah Ann Dyer was born on 3 August 1967 in Brixton, London, to Jamaican parents. Her father was in the Royal Air Force and later worked on oil rigs. Her mother was a nurse before taking a government position in the environmental department. She describes her parents as "very strict, very Jamaican". At the age of 6, she moved in with her grandfather into a two-up two-down in Acre Lane, Brixton, who ran a nightclub in the basement, in which she mentions there was "always music and rum" and posters of Bob Marley and Muhammad Ali, which inspired her. As a child, she wanted to be a pianist. At the age of 14, she read Macbeth, later stating that she loved the "intricacy and complexity of Shakespeare's play".

Skunk Anansie 

After forming in 1994, the band released three albums, Paranoid & Sunburnt, Stoosh and Post Orgasmic Chill, which sold more than 4 million copies worldwide; their biggest hit was the single "Weak". The band disbanded in 2001 after which she embarked a solo career and reformed in 2009.  they are still recording and touring. Skunk Anansie have been unapologetic in their reluctance to alter their substance or aesthetic to satisfy others around them since their inception in 1994. Their early singles established the tone. First, an anti-fascist anthem, Little Baby Swastikkka. The sequel, Selling Jesus, is a critical examination of organized religion and corporate avarice. The band hit it off right on, releasing six studio albums and touring with David Bowie, U2, and Lenny Kravitz.

Solo career 

After Skunk Anansie split, Skin released her debut solo album bumpoos. The album was toned down from her Skunk Anansie days and did not gain the same acclaim from Skunk Anansie fans. She even ditched her trademark bald look and grew her hair into a boyish crop. While the album was not a massive success in the UK, two singles were released from it: "Trashed" and "Faithfulness". "Lost", a double A-side with "Getting Away with It", was a planned third single but was pulled shortly before release; promo CDs were sent out to radio stations but it received no airplay. Elsewhere in Europe the album's success was greater. For example, in Italy it peaked at number 6 in the album chart and in Germany at number 18.

After releasing Fleshwounds, Skin went on to perform various solo gigs around Europe. She was also support for the European leg of Robbie Williams' and Placebo's world tours.

Soon after touring she began to record her second album, Fake Chemical State, which was released for sale on 20 March 2006, preceded by new single "Just Let the Sun" two weeks earlier. The first single actually issued from this album was "Alone in My Room", a download-only track released on 7 November 2005. "Alone in My Room" was also the name given to Skin's first solo tour in two years, which commenced in Berlin in November 2005. For this album she shaved her head bald again, returning to the look she had in her Skunk Anansie days.

Skin's next solo outing was a small promotional "Fake Chemical State" tour. It started in Glasgow on 17 March 2006. She went on to perform many festivals around Europe including Rock Werchter in Belgium and the Southside/Hurricane festivals in Germany. She performed on the main stage at most of these festivals.

In February 2008, she announced that she was working with Timo Maas and Martin Buttrich on a side project called "Format-3". Her 2008 song "Tear Down These Houses" was released as a part of the soundtrack to Parlami d'Amore, directed by Silvio Muccino.

She sings in the opening musical piece "Renaissance", in Medici: Masters of Florence, a Netflix original series released in October 2016.

Skin has always had a love of electronic music and she moved into the genre when her friend Damian Lazarus gave her a mixer in 2009. Going under the moniker D-Dyer she made her first steps into the DJ world which she has now been doing for the past decade. She plays Techno, Tech House and Minimal all over the world at classic venues such as Output in New York, Sound Nightclub in LA and Fabric in London.

In 2015 Skin collaborated with techno icon Nicole Moudaber and they released the Breed EP on Nicole's Mood Records. It features five tracks including "Don't Talk To Me I'm Dancing". In 2016 she DJ-ed at Carl Cox's Revolution in Ibiza, Coachella and also released Techno music under the guise of Juvenal through Mood Records.

In 2020, Skin participated in the UK version of The Masked Singer, appearing as Duck. Her identity was revealed in episode six, when she was eliminated. A memoir, It Takes Blood and Guts, co-written with Lucy O'Brien, was published by Simon & Schuster in September 2020. On 18 October 2020, Skin began presenting a Sunday-night radio show titled The Skin Show on Absolute Radio.

Personal life 
Skin graduated with a BA (Hons) degree in Interior Architecture & Design from Teesside Polytechnic in 1989 and received an honorary Master of Arts degree from Teesside University in 2000.
Skin is openly bisexual. In 2013, she entered into a civil partnership with Christiana Wyly, daughter of American billionaire Sam Wyly. The couple split in 2015. In September 2020, Skin announced her engagement to Rayne Baron. In June 2021, the couple announced they are expecting their first child.

In January 2021, Skin assumed the role of Chancellor at Leeds Arts University in Leeds, England.

Since the United Kingdom European Union membership referendum in 2016, Skin has talked against Brexit and its effect in terms of rise in racism, labour shortage and impoverishment of British culture in numerous interviews.

She was appointed Officer of the Order of the British Empire (OBE) in the 2021 Birthday Honours for services to music.

After the results of the 2022 Italian election were announced, Skin said that she was disappointed that the Italian people voted for Giorgia Meloni and said that Italy was "sinking towards fascism" once again.

Discography

Solo studio albums 
Fleshwounds (2003)
Fake Chemical State (2006)

Guest appearances 
 Vocals on "Carmen Queasy" from Maxim's (of The Prodigy) 2000 solo album, Hell's Kitchen – UK Chart Number 33
 Vocals on "Licking Cream" from Sevendust's second album, Home
 Vocals on "You Can't Find Peace", by Pale3, which was made for the Tom Tykwer film  (The Princess and the Warrior)
 Vocals on "Good Times", by Ed Case – UK Chart Number 49
 Vocals on "If This Ain't Love" by Erick Morillo & Eddie Thoneick – released 2012
 Contributes vocals to "Still Standing" from Unity – The Official Athens 2004 Olympic Games Album
 Performs "Kill Everything" on the OST of 
 Contributes vocals to "" on the album  by Marlene Kuntz
 Contributes vocals on "" (Seasons of Love) from the cast album to the Italian production ofRent
 Vocals on "Meat" from Tony Iommi's album Iommi
 Vocals on "Comfort of Strangers" on the OST to Timecode
 Contributes to charity single "It's Only Rock And Roll"
 "Not an Addict" (with K's Choice) – live at Pinkpop 1996
 "Army of Me" (with Björk) – live version on Top of the Pops, 5 May 1995
 "Anti Love Song" (Betty Davis cover; live on Taratata with Lenny Kravitz)
 Vocals on "Nothing Matters" by Mark Knight.

References

Sources

External links 

Official Skin website
Skin at V2 MUSIC UK – her record label

The Skin Show on Absolute Radio
Official Instagram Profile
BBC Radio 4 Front Row : Skin on her new memoir

Living people
1967 births
20th-century Black British women singers
21st-century Black British women singers
Alternative metal musicians
Alumni of Teesside University
Bisexual musicians
Bisexual women
Black British rock musicians
British autobiographers
British people of Jamaican descent
Women heavy metal singers
Women rock singers
LGBT Black British people
English LGBT musicians
British LGBT singers
People from Brixton
Singers from London
Officers of the Order of the British Empire